Pedro Alex Carrizo Cordova (born 9 November 1980) is a retired Chilean former professional footballer who played as a goalkeeper and his last team was Deportes La Serena.

Honours

Club
San Marcos de Arica
 Primera B: 2012

External links
 
 

1980 births
Living people
Chilean footballers
Chilean Primera División players
Primera B de Chile players
Deportes La Serena footballers
San Marcos de Arica footballers
Deportes Ovalle footballers
C.D. Antofagasta footballers
Association football goalkeepers
People from Antofagasta